The Cimarron Kid is a 1952 American Western film directed by Budd Boetticher and starring Audie Murphy and  Beverly Tyler.

Plot
Bill Doolin (Audie Murphy) is released from jail and is going home on the train when it is held up by his boyhood friends, the Dalton Gang. Doolin finds himself accused of helping the crime and winds up an outlaw.

Cast
 Audie Murphy as Bill Doolin / the Cimarron Kid
 Beverly Tyler as Carrie Roberts
 James Best as Bitter Creek Dalton
 Yvette Duguay as Rose (as Yvette Dugay)
 John Hudson as Dynamite Dick Dalton
 Hugh O'Brian as Red Buck
 Roy Roberts as Pat Roberts
 David Bauer as Sam Swanson (as David Wolfe) 
 Noah Beery Jr. as Bob Dalton
 Leif Erickson as Marshal John Sutton
 John Hubbard as George Weber
 Frank Silvera as Stacey Marshall

Production
The film was based on a story by Louis Stevens. It was assigned to producer Ted Richmond at Universal for Audie Murphy in April 1951.

It was the first Western from Budd Boetticher, who later became famous for his work in the genre. “I became a Western director because they thought I looked like one and they thought I rode better than anyone else," said Boetticher later. "And I didn’t know anything about the West.” It was also the director's first film in color and his first under a long term contract with Universal Pictures.

In the original script, Murphy's character died at the end of the movie, but the studio decided to change it to reflect the actor's rising popularity.

The railroad scenes were filmed on the Sierra Railroad in Tuolumne County, California.

See also

 List of American films of 1952

References

External links

 
 
 
 

1952 films
1952 Western (genre) films
Audie Murphy
Films directed by Budd Boetticher
American Western (genre) films
Universal Pictures films
1950s English-language films
1950s American films